The National Organization for Organ and Tissue Donation and Transplant (NOD-Lb) is a Lebanese non-profit organization affiliated to the Lebanese Ministry of Public Health. NOD-Lb (previously known as NOOTDT) was created by a joint venture between the Ministry of Public Health and the Lebanese Order of Physicians in Beirut.

NOOTDT's mission

 To retrieve organs and tissues from any donor in all Lebanese regions by a skilled coordinator team available 24 hours a day, 7 days a week.
 To provide locally retrieved organs and tissues to patients in need of organ and tissue transplantation.
 To implement a Lebanese Model for Organ and Tissue Donation and Transplantation:
 Define the criteria of donation and transplantation in Lebanon
 Responsible for a continuous education of ICU and ER personnel
 Plan the conditions of the national waiting list and a network system
 Carry on establishing a registry of death, chronic diseases, donation and transplantation
 To promote organ and tissue donation by continuous awareness campaigns for the public
 Introduce organ and tissue donation and transplantation in schools and universities program
 To coordinate with international organ and tissue banking organizations
 Organize and participate a national and international medical congress or courses in the field

References

2002 establishments in Lebanon
Organizations established in 2002
Medical and health organisations based in Lebanon
Transplant organizations